The 11th Tejano Music Awards were held in 1991. They recognized accomplishments by musicians from the previous year. The Tejano Music Awards is an annual awards ceremony recognizing Tejano music musicians.

Award winners

Vocalists of The Year 
Male Vocalist of The Year
Joe Lopez
Female Vocalist of The Year
Selena

Vocal Duo Of the Year 
Joe Lopez, Jimmy Gonzalez and Mazz

Albums of the Year 
Orchestra (No Te Olvidare)
Conjunto (Sensaciones)
Traditional (Mi Accordeon Y Yo by Ramón Ayala)

Songs of The Year 
Song of The Year
No Te Olvidare by Mazz
Single of The Year
Amor Con Amor by Mazz
Tejano Country Song of The Year
She's Not Alone by David Lee Garza y Los Musicales

Entertainers of the Year 
Male Entertainer of The Year
Emilio Navaira
Female Entertainer of The Year
Selena

Most Promising Band of The Year 
Joe Lopez

Song-writer of The Year 
La Fiebre

See also 
Tejano Music Awards

References 

Tejano Music Awards
Tejano Music Awards by year
Tejano Music Awards
Tejano Music Awards